Sandip may refer to:

Sandip Banerjee (born 1983), Indian first-class cricketer
Sandip Basu, Indian physician of Nuclear Medicine, Head of Nuclear Medicine Academic Program at the Bhabha Atomic Research Centre
Sandip Kumar Basu (born 1944), Indian molecular biologist and the holder of the J. C. Bose Chair of the National Academy of Sciences, India
Sandip Bhattacharjee (born 1980), Indian classical singer belonging to the Kirana gharana style of singing
Sandip Burman, tabla player from West Bengal, India
Sandip Chakrabarti, Indian astrophysicist
Sandip Chakravarty, tabla player, musician, DJ and TV presenter (stage name Sandyman)
Sandip Das, Indian corporate executive in the telecom business
Sandip Gupta (born 1967), former Kenyan cricketer
Sandip Mandi (born 2002), Indian professional footballer
Sandip Maniar (born 1977), Indian cricketer
Sandip Nandy (born 1975), former Indian professional footballer
Sandip Rai, former defender playing for Three Star Club in Martyr's Memorial A-Division League
Sandip Ray (born 1953), Indian film director and music director who mainly works in Bengali cinema
Sandip Roy (cricketer) (born 1989), Bangladeshi cricketer
Sandip Sen (born 1966), Indian business executive
Sandip Soparrkar (born 1964), Indian Latin and ballroom dancer, Bollywood choreographer, actor
Sandip Ssingh, Indian film maker
Sandip Trivedi (born 1963), Indian theoretical physicist working at TIFR, Mumbai, India
Sandip Verma, Baroness Verma (born 1959), Indian-British politician in the United Kingdom

See also
Sandip Foundation, private institute/college in Mahiravani, Nasik, Maharashtra, India
Sandip University, Nashik, private university and UGC recognised, located in Nashik, Maharashtra, India
Sandip University, Sijoul, private university located in Sijoul, Madhubani district, Bihar, India
Saandip
Sandeep (disambiguation)
Sandwip
Sawndip